Balmazújvárosi FC, also known by the sponsor name Balmaz Kamilla Gyógyfürdő or the company name Balmazújváros Sport, is a Hungarian football club located in Balmazújváros, Hungary. It currently plays in Nemzeti Bajnokság I. The team's colors are orange and black.

History
Between 2011 and 2016 the club received 1.2 billion HUF as a backing to develop the club's stadium and the team.

On 17 September 2012, László Arany was sacked by the club after the defeat against Ceglédi VSE at home. The team with Arany could win only the first match of the 2012–13 Nemzeti Bajnokság II season against DVSC-DEAC but after they lost four matches in a row.

In the 2014–15 Nemzeti Bajnokság II season Balmazújváros managed to escape from relegation from the second division by finishing 13th and gaining one point more than their rival Siófok.

In the 2015–16 Nemzeti Bajnokság II season Balmazújváros finished 5th therefore they could not get promoted to the first division.

On 4 June 2017, Balmazújváros finished second in the 2016–17 Nemzeti Bajnokság II season thereby gaining promotion to the highest level of the Hungarian League system. Balmazújváros is going to play in the 2017–18 Nemzeti Bajnokság I season. On the 38th match day Balmazújváros hosted their rival Kisvárda at home at the Balmazújvárosi Városi Sportpálya, Balmazújváros on 4 June 2017. The match was won by Balmazújváros by 1–0 and the only goal of the match was scored by Ervin Zsiga in the 84th minute.

On 13 June 2017, the management of Balmazújváros FC appointed Ferenc Horváth as the manager of the club. Previously Horváth managed Kecskeméti TE, Paksi FC, Győri ETO FC, Videoton FC, and Diósgyőri VTK.

On 3 January 2018, Balázs Bekő was sacked since the club finished the first half of the 2018–19 Nemzeti Bajnokság II season at the 18th position. Toni Golem was appointed as the manager of the club.

On 29 August 2019, the club was excluded from the 2019–20 Nemzeti Bajnokság II.

Stadium

Balmazújváros play their home matches at the Városi Sportpálya with a capacity of 2,400. The stadium was opened in 2013.

Current squad
As of 11 August 2018.

Out to Loan

Season results
The following table includes the seasons the club spent in the Nemzeti Bajnokság I only.

: defunct
Italics indicate that the season is still in progress.
R6= 6th round (last 128 teams) in Magyar Kupa competitions.
R7= 7th round (last 64 teams)
R8= 8th round (last 32 teams)
QF = quarter-finals (last 8 teams)
SF = semi-finals
R = runner up

Managers
  Ferenc Horváth
  Balázs Bekő (-3 Jan 2019)
  Toni Golem (7 Jan 2019-Jun 2019)

References

External links 
 Official website Balmaz Kamilla Gyógyfürdő 
 Official page of Balmaz Kamilla Gyógyfürdő
 Soccerway

 
Football clubs in Hungary
Association football clubs established in 2011
2011 establishments in Hungary